Laurette Stephanie Tuckerman (born 1956) is a mathematical physicist working in the areas of hydrodynamic instability, bifurcation theory, and computational fluid dynamics. She is currently a director of research for the Centre national de la recherche scientifique, at the Physics and Mechanics of Heterogeneous Media Laboratory of ESPCI Paris.

Early life 
Tuckerman was born in New York City in 1956. Her mother was a journalist for the Agence France Presse covering the United Nations who had left France during World War II, and her father was a New York City union negotiator and devoted amateur pianist. She attended Hunter College High School.

Education 
Tuckerman attended Wesleyan University and Princeton University and obtained a Ph.D in applied mathematics from Massachusetts Institute of Technology in 1984.

Career 
Tuckerman first worked at the Saclay Nuclear Research Centre in France and then at University of Texas at Austin, where she was a postdoc at the Center for Nonlinear Dynamics and then a faculty member in the department of mathematics. In 1994, she became a researcher at Centre National de la Recherche Scientifique in France. She has also taught at Ecole Polytechnique and at École normale supérieure (Paris).

Awards

In 2002, she was elected as fellow of the American Physical Society and in 2018 she became a fellow of Euromech.

References

External links
Home page

Living people
1956 births
20th-century American mathematicians
21st-century American mathematicians
21st-century American physicists
American women mathematicians
American women physicists
Mathematical physicists
Princeton University alumni
Massachusetts Institute of Technology School of Science alumni
University of Texas at Austin faculty
Fellows of the American Physical Society
20th-century women mathematicians
21st-century women mathematicians
Fluid dynamicists
20th-century American women
21st-century American women